Craig Barron (born April 6, 1961) is an American visual effects artist and creative director at Magnopus, a media company that produces visual development and virtual production services for motion pictures,  television, museums and multimedia platforms.

Working at Industrial Light & Magic, Barron contributed to the visual effects on such films as The Empire Strikes Back, Raiders of the Lost Ark, and E.T. the Extra-Terrestrial. At his own VFX studio Matte World Digital, he produced visual effects on Zodiac, Alice in Wonderland and Hugo. Over the course of his VFX career, Barron contributed to the visual effects on more than 100 films. He is an Emmy Award recipient for By Dawn's Early Light and he received an Oscar nomination for Best Visual Effects on Batman Returns. In 2009, he won an Oscar for Best Visual Effects on The Curious Case of Benjamin Button.

Barron is a film historian, museum exhibit curator, and educator with a focus on the history of visual effects in classic films, before and after the digital age. He hosts presentations and lectures on the visual effects from Hollywood’s studio age. He produces short documentaries that reveal the formerly secret history of how visual effects pioneers created seamless visuals using matte paintings, miniatures and optical effects.

Career

Visual effects supervisor

Industrial Light & Magic 
Hired at age 18 by VFX cinematographer Richard Edlund in 1979, Barron was then the youngest person working at ILM. He started out in the matte painting department with VFX photographer Neil Krepela, and was apprentice to concept illustrator/matte painter Ralph McQuarrie. Barron eventually was responsible for compositing matte-painted effects for scenes in landmark visual-effects films, including The Empire Strikes Back, Raiders of the Lost Ark, and E.T. the Extra-Terrestrial. He later told Star Wars Insider that he had originally wanted a job in animation and stop motion, but he jumped at the chance to join the matte painting department when there was an opening. Accompanied by matte painters Michael Pangrazio and Chris Evans, at times on international location shoots, Barron and crew designed and photographed matte shots for feature films. From 1984 to 1988 he was matte photography supervisor, working to combine matte paintings and miniatures with live-action photography. He is credited as director of matte photography on Willow (1988), his last film at ILM, before leaving to start his own company Matte World.

Matte World Digital 
Co-founded by Barron, Pangrazio and executive producer Krystyna Demkowicz in 1988, Matte World produced seamless matte-painting effects for film and television productions from its Novato, California studio. Soon after formation, Barron's work for HBO's By Dawn's Early Light won an Emmy for Outstanding Visual Effects. Throughout the 1980s, Barron and his crew produced traditional effects shots with glass matte paintings and miniature models. Their work received an Academy Award nomination
for Best Visual Effects for Batman Returns in 1992.

That same year, the company was renamed Matte World Digital (MWD) to reflect the new technological tools available to matte painters. MWD produced digital environments for feature films, commercials, cable television, computer games and IMAX projects, serving the artistic visions of directors Martin Scorsese, Francis Ford Coppola, James Cameron, Alfonso Cuaron, Gore Verbinski, Ron Howard, Tim Burton, David Fincher, Leonard Nimoy, and Frank Darabont, among others. Barron contributed to the visual effects of more than 100 films at MWD, innovating digital-effects techniques for Zodiac, Alice in Wonderland, and The Curious Case of Benjamin Button, which won the Academy Award for Best Visual Effects in 2009. MWD closed in 2012 after 24 years of service. The company's last project was creating stereo CGI matte paintings of 1930s-era Paris and Georges Méliès' glass studio for Martin Scorsese's Hugo.

Innovations 
Matte World Digital was the first company to apply radiosity rendering to film, for Martin Scorsese's Casino. Collaborating with software company LightScape, the MWD crew was able to simulate the reflective effect of millions of neon lights from the 1970s-era Las Vegas strip. Radiosity rendering provided a true simulation of bounce-light reflectivity in a computer-generated environment.

For David Fincher's Zodiac, another film mainly set in the 1970s, shots were needed to establish the grittier San Francisco of that era. Barron shot digital images of existing city-building textures, then added painted period details in the computer. One such shot features the Embarcadero Freeway alongside the Ferry Building and San Francisco Bay. The freeway had been demolished after the 1989 Loma Prieta earthquake so MWD digitally rebuilt the structure, viewed from an overhead computer-generated "helicopter-shot" to introduce San Francisco in 1969. CG lighting techniques were applied for a sped-up animated sequence showing the Transamerica Pyramid being built, establishing the passage of time. Barron researched archival photographs and architectural drawings for the shot.

Barron worked with Fincher again in 2008 to build several digital matte and CGI environments for The Curious Case of Benjamin Button. The interior of the film's New Orleans train station had to change and deteriorate, representing different eras. MWD built the CGI station interiors using Next Limit's Maxwell rendering software—software that was generally used as an architectural visualization and product-design tool. MWD revamped it to mimic real-world lighting as seen from multiple angles and light sources.

Other visual effects work
While heading Matte World Digital, Barron co-produced and directed the science-fiction short, The Utilizer, broadcast on Syfy (then called the Sci-Fi Channel) in 1996. The film won the best special effects award at the Chicago International Film Festival.

Barron was a visual effects supervisor at Tippett Studio in 2013, where he developed digital environments for film and commercial productions alongside his former ILM co-worker Phil Tippett.

Film historian

Author 
Growing up watching classic films, Barron was inspired by and curious about how special effects were created. He sought out and interviewed retired Hollywood studio-era cameramen and matte painters who revealed the formerly secretive world of visual effects techniques that were used in films such as King Kong, The Wizard of Oz, and Citizen Kane. This oral history of movie-making, along with a growing collection of behind-the-scenes photographs, were the basis of Barron's book, The Invisible Art: The Legends of Movie Matte Painting. The Invisible Art..., co-wrriten with Mark Cotta Vaz, is the first comprehensive book on the history of matte painting and its transition into the digital age. The New York Times called it "Eye-opening…increas[ing] our wonder at this heretofore 'invisible art.'"

Educator 
As a public-programs lecturer for the Academy of Motion Picture Arts and Sciences (AMPAS), Barron presents public screenings showcasing the art and technique of visual effects in classic studio films, often partnering with friend and fellow effects artist, sound designer Ben Burtt. The duo have been continuing guest hosts on the TCM Network and Barron has been an ongoing contributor to the annual TCM Classic Film Festival in Hollywood since 2014. For their presentations, Barron and Burtt rely on extensive research and digital recreations to discover and uncover the hidden history of a century of film production. When preparing for a screening of Gunga Din, they visited the Lone Pine, California Alabama Hills location where the film was shot in 1938, and found pieces of the set buried there. Using camera drones, they then recreated the film's locations as CGI environments. 

Barron has been an adjunct associate professor at the USC School of Cinematic Arts since 2015. His "World of Visual Effects" course focuses on the history of visual effects in film and how visual effects have influenced narratives in filmmaking from its inception to today.

Selected presentations
All screenings co-hosted by Barron and Burtt unless otherwise noted.
Techno Chaplin – Modern Times with John Bengstson – Behind-the-scenes photos and multimedia tour explaining how Chaplin used mattes, process shots, miniatures and rear projection within industrial settings of 1930s Los Angeles. 2008, Hollywood/San Rafael, CA.
The Adventures of Robin Hood – Featured matte paintings and sound design with recreation of archery tests from the film. 2012, New York, NY.
Mysteries of the Krell: Making Forbidden Planet – Breakdown of the film's visual effects and innovative sound design alongside collection of rare miniatures, production designs, props, the original Robby the Robot, and analog source tapes from the electronic soundtrack by composers Bebe and Louis Barron. 2011-2012, Hollywood/San Rafael, CA. 
The War of the Worlds – Demonstration of producer George Pal's Oscar-winning visual effects for TCM Classic Film Festival 2016, Hollywood, CA.
The Flame and the Arrow - Discussion and demonstration of director Jacques Tourneur and crew's matte painting and sound effects work for TCM Classic Film Festival 2022, Hollywood, CA.

Documentarian 
Barron produces and is featured in a number of documentary supplements for DVD and Blu-ray editions from The Criterion Collection and Turner Classic Movies. The documentary shorts, often in conjunction with Burtt, explain with interviews, animated sequences and reenactments, how 3D effects were produced in classic Hollywood films, such as Citizen Kane, It's a Wonderful Life, and The Incredible Shrinking Man.

Selected documentary filmography
 Modern Times (1936) / A Bucket of Water and a Glass Matte (2010) – Barron and Burtt demonstrate Chaplin's use of miniatures and sound effects in the film's factory and roller-skating scenes. 
 Rebecca (1940) / Constructing the Eerie World of Rebecca (2017) – Barron demonstrates the large-scale Manderlay miniature that Hitchcock’s crew built and filmed onset, which included a miniature car and destruction by fire.
 A Matter of Life and Death (1946) / Documentary supplement (2018) – A detailed account and 3D rendering of how Michael Powell conceived of and carried out the seemingly endless “stairway to heaven” scene with the use of set design, miniatures and camera angles.
 Bringing Up Baby (1938), But What About My Leopard? The Magic of Optical Effects Pioneer Linwood Dunn – Interview with Linwood Dunn and demonstration on how a live leopard was safely shot on set with actors.
 Chain Lightning (1950), Jet Jockeys in Love: The Making of Chain Lightning – Aired for TCM Film Festival on HBOMax. Barron and Burtt explain the film’s visual effects and sound design while “piloting” a vintage fighter jet in this Vitaphone-parody short.

Barron and Burtt wrote and produced the documentary series Secrets of the Hollywood Archives, premiering on The Criterion Channel in the summer of 2022. Each five-minute episode focuses on one scene of a classic Hollywood film to demonstrate how studio VFX departments created its visual effects. In such films as Action in the North Atlantic, 12 O’Clock High, and Forbidden Planet, the producers dig through outtakes that were never released to the public, as well as production clips, stock shots and sound-effect recordings to find buried historical documentation of visual-effects history and technique.

Museum development and visual effects advisor 
From 2007 to the present, Barron served on several planning committees tasked with developing the Academy Museum of Motion Pictures. For the Museum’s inaugural exhibit on Citizen Kane, he co-produced videos honoring effects master Linwood Dunn and his use of mattes, miniatures and the optical printer to create Kane’s iconic visuals. Painted mattes and the Wayne Manor model for Batman Returns from the Matte World Digital archive were on display at the Academy Museum's inaugural opening in 2021.

Creative director 
In 2014 Barron became creative director at Magnopus, a media company based in Los Angeles. Magnopus provides visual development and virtual production for motion pictures, television, and museum exhibits. Barron specializes in interactive and immersive virtual-reality experiences that put filmmakers "inside the movie" during production. Other projects include remote educational experiences with augmented virtual-reality for museums and other multimedia platforms. 

At Magnopus, Barron directed the VR tie-in to 2017's Blade Runner 2049. Entitled Blade Runner 2049: Memory Lab, the 30-minute VR production is set in the world of the film where users act as replicant android hunters. A review in UploadVR said the experience, "...manages to contribute somewhat to 2049's story without stepping on it, shedding more light on one of the film's central characters that gives the entire piece an even deeper sense of purpose." Memory Lab was nominated for an Emmy for Outstanding Original Interactive Program in 2018.

In partnership with Television City and Holocaust Museum LA, Magnopus, with Barron as creative director, developed a virtual museum experience that allows viewers to partake in the Holocaust Museum’s educational exhibits. The AR immersive technology tool on iOS devices expands the range of the museum to a new worldwide audience.

In 2022, Magnopus and Walt Disney Studios’ StudioLab developed the first augmented reality experience for Disney+ for Remembering, a short film produced by and starring Brie Larson and directed by Elijah Allan-Blitz. The film was shot on LED stages at NantStudios, allowing its actors to react to its fanciful "world of imagination" during production. As visual effects supervisor, Barron oversaw production of the cross-platform experience. Viewers can watch the film through an iOS device using the "Remembering: The AR Experience" app, bringing 3D digital elements of waterfalls, forests and dolphins into their family living rooms.

Awards, honors and affiliations

Awards and nominations 
 By Dawn's Early Light – Emmy for Outstanding Visual Effects, 1990
 Batman Returns – Academy and BAFTA Award nominations for Achievement in Visual Effects, 1992
 The Utilizer – Gold Plaque for Best Special Effects, Chicago International Film Festival, 1996
 The Truman Show – BAFTA Award nomination for Achievement in Special Visual Effects, 1999
 The Invisible Art: The Legends of Movie Matte Painting, with Mark Cotta Vaz – Theatre Library Association of New York Outstanding Book on Film Award, 2003; Theatre Technology Golden Pen Book Award, 2004
 Greece: Secrets of the Past – Visual Effects Society (VES) Award nomination for Outstanding Visual Effects in a special venue project, 2006
 Zodiac – VES Award nomination for Outstanding Visual Effects in a Motion Picture, 2007
 The Curious Case of Benjamin Button – Academy and BAFTA Awards for Achievement in Visual Effects, 2009
 VES Founders Award, 2013
 Blade Runner 2049: Memory Lab – Emmy nomination for Outstanding Original Interactive Program, 2018, Clio Entertainment Bronze Winner for Virtual/Augmented Reality, 2018
 VES Fellows Award, 2018

Honors and affiliations 
 Honorary Doctorate of Letters, PhD, Academy of Art University, San Francisco, 1979
 Associate member of the American Society of Cinematographers
 Founding member of the Visual Effects Society, 1997
 Academy of Motion Picture Arts and Sciences, Board of Governors representing the Visual Effects Branch, 2005-2022
 Co-chair of the AMPAS Science & Technology Council, 2014-2022

Selected filmography 

Hugo, 2011
Captain America: The First Avenger, 2011
Alice in Wonderland, 2010
Terminator Salvation, 2009
The Curious Case of Benjamin Button, 2008
The Golden Compass, 2007
Zodiac, 2007
Invincible, 2006
The Alamo, 2004
Down With Love, 2003
The Ring, 2002
The Green Mile, 1999
The Truman Show, 1998
Titanic, 1997
Star Trek: First Contact, 1996
Independence Day, 1996
Casino, 1995
Clear and Present Danger, 1994
Hocus Pocus, 1993
Bram Stoker’s Dracula, 1992
Batman Returns, 1992
Terminator 2: Judgment Day, 1991
Star Trek VI: The Undiscovered Country, 1991
Gremlins 2: The New Batch, 1990
By Dawn's Early Light (television), 1990
Willow, 1988
Star Trek IV: The Voyage Home, 1986
Labyrinth, 1986
The Goonies, 1985
Indiana Jones and the Temple of Doom, 1984
The NeverEnding Story, 1984
Star Trek III: The Search for Spock, 1984
Starman, 1984
Return of the Jedi, 1983
Poltergeist, 1982
Star Trek II: The Wrath of Khan, 1982
E.T. the Extra-Terrestrial, 1982
Raiders of the Lost Ark, 1981
The Empire Strikes Back, 1980

Publications 
 Barron, Craig and Cotta Vaz, Mark (2002). The Invisible Art: The Legends of Movie Matte Painting. San Francisco: Chronicle Books. .
 Barron, Craig (July 23, 1998). Matte Painting in the Digital Age. "Invisible Effects" series transcript. Orlando, FL: SIGGRAPH 98.

References

External links 

 Magnopus

Special effects people
Visual effects supervisors
Living people
People from Marin County, California
American film historians
American male non-fiction writers
1961 births
Artists from Berkeley, California
Cinema of the San Francisco Bay Area
Best Visual Effects Academy Award winners
Best Visual Effects BAFTA Award winners
Historians from California